The 12073 / 12074 Bhubaneswar–Howrah Jan Shatabdi Express is a Superfast Express train of the Jan Shatabdi Express  series belonging to Indian Railways – East Coast Railway zone that runs between  and  in India.

It operates as train number 12074 from Bhubaneswar to Howrah Junction and as train number 12073 in the reverse direction, serving the states of Odisha and West Bengal.

It is part of the Jan Shatabdi Express series launched by the former railway minister of India, Mr. Nitish Kumar in the 2002 / 03 Rail Budget  .

Coaches

The 12074 / 73 Bhubaneswar–Howrah Jan Shatabdi Express has 2 AC Chair Car, 13 Second Class seating & 2 EOG. It does not carry a pantry car.

As is customary with most train services in India, coach composition may be amended at the discretion of Indian Railways depending on demand.

Service

As the average speed of the train is above , as per Indian Railways rules, its fare includes a Superfast surcharge.

Routeing

When the train was extended up to Bhubaneswar the train did not use to go via Cuttack it had other route later on the train connected via Cuttack.

Traction
It is hauled by a Bondamunda/Howrah-based WAP-7 locomotive on its entire journey.

References 

 http://pib.nic.in/archive/railbudget/railbgt2002-03/railbgtsp1.html
 https://web.archive.org/web/20160126012037/http://www.indianrail.gov.in/jan_shatabdi.html
 http://pib.nic.in/archieve/lreleng/lyr2002/rapr2002/12042002/r120420021.html

External links

Trains from Howrah Junction railway station
Rail transport in Howrah
Transport in Bhubaneswar
Rail transport in West Bengal
Rail transport in Odisha
Jan Shatabdi Express trains